Mayfair is an unincorporated community in Kern County, California.

References

Unincorporated communities in Kern County, California
Unincorporated communities in California